Dimitri Kahirau (born October 10, 1992 in Potsdam, Germany) is a Belarusian figure skater. He is the 2007 Belarusian national bronze medalist. He placed 37th at the 2007 World Junior Figure Skating Championships. He is a two-season competitor on the Junior Grand Prix.

References
 

Belarusian male single skaters
1992 births
Living people
Sportspeople from Potsdam